Ellen Maria Brusewitz (née Holmström, 10 November 1878 – 17 May 1952) was a Swedish tennis player. She competed in the women's outdoor singles event at the 1912 Summer Olympics and finished seventh, behind her younger sister Annie Holmström.

References

External links
 

1878 births
1952 deaths
Swedish female tennis players
Olympic tennis players of Sweden
Tennis players at the 1912 Summer Olympics
People from Jönköping
Sportspeople from Jönköping County